The 1945 Southwestern Louisiana Bulldogs football team was an American football team that represented the Southwestern Louisiana Institute of Liberal and Technical Learning (now known as the University of Louisiana at Lafayette) in the Louisiana Intercollegiate Conference during the 1945 college football season. In their fourth year under head coach Louis Whitman, the team compiled a 1–6–1 record.

Schedule
The Bulldogs were also scheduled to play  on October 13 and a second game against the Lake Charles AAF on November 3, but both were canceled.

References

Southwestern Louisiana
Louisiana Ragin' Cajuns football seasons
Southwestern Louisiana Bulldogs football